Group B of the 2011 Fed Cup Americas Zone Group II was one of two pools in the Americas Zone of the 2011 Fed Cup. Five teams competed in a round robin competition, with the teams proceeding to their respective sections of the play-offs: the top two teams play for advancement to the 2012 Group I.

Bahamas vs. Venezuela

Ecuador vs. Costa Rica

Bahamas vs. Panama

Ecuador vs. Venezuela

Ecuador vs. Panama

Costa Rica vs. Venezuela

Bahamas vs. Costa Rica

Venezuela vs. Panama

Bahamas vs. Ecuador

Costa Rica vs. Panama

References

External links 
 Fed Cup website

2011 Fed Cup Americas Zone